Mena Raion  was a raion (district) of Chernihiv Oblast, northern Ukraine. Its administrative centre was located at the city of Mena. The raion was abolished on 18 July 2020 as part of the administrative reform of Ukraine, which reduced the number of raions of Chernihiv Oblast to five. The area of Mena Raion was split between Chernihiv and Koriukivka Raions. The last estimate of the raion population was 

At the time of disestablishment, the raion consisted of two hromadas:
 Berezna settlement hromada with the administration in the urban-type settlement of Berezna, transferred to Chernihiv Raion;
 Mena urban hromada with the administration in Mena, transferred to Koriukivka Raion.

References

Former raions of Chernihiv Oblast
1923 establishments in Ukraine
Ukrainian raions abolished during the 2020 administrative reform